Big Bird, also known as the Big Bird lineage, is one of the species of Darwin's finches that is exclusively present on Daphne Major of the Galápagos islands. It originated from a mixed-breed (hybrid) of the Española cactus finch (Geospiza conirostris) and the medium ground finch (Geospiza fortis) that immigrated to Daphne Major in 1981. It resembles the medium ground finch but is relatively larger, hence, the name. The original Big Bird bred with a female medium ground finch and the offspring tend to breed only with their own family members, thereby giving rise to reproductive isolation and undergoing speciation. Discovered by the research team of Peter and Rosemary Grant, the formation of Big Birds as a distinct species is considered as an instance of observed speciation and as a process of evolution by natural selection.

References 

Geospiza
Endemic birds of the Galápagos Islands
Evolution of birds
Bird hybrids